Pseudorhaphitoma kilburni is a small sea snail, a marine gastropod mollusk in the family Mangeliidae.

Description

Distribution
This marine species occurs in the Red Sea and off Yemen

References

External links
 

kilburni
Gastropods described in 2001